Richard J. Hilderbrand (born January 26, 1969) is an American politician and businessman serving as a member of the Kansas Senate from the 13th district. After Jake LaTurner was appointed Kansas State Treasurer, Hilderbrand was selected to serve for the remainder of his term in the Senate.

Early career 
Prior to serving in the Senate, Hilderbrand operated an insurance company and served as a commissioner of Cherokee County, Kansas.

Personal life 
Hilderbrand has lived in Baxter Springs, Kansas and Galena, Kansas.

References

External links
Vote Smart Richard Hilderbrand

Living people
Republican Party Kansas state senators
Businesspeople from Kansas
People from Baxter Springs, Kansas
People from Galena, Kansas
21st-century American politicians
1969 births